Roville-aux-Chênes is a commune in the Vosges department in Grand Est in northeastern France.

Geography
The river Mortagne forms part of the commune's western border.

See also
Communes of the Vosges department

References

Communes of Vosges (department)